Jagdalpur railway station is a railway station located in Bastar district, Chhattisgarh which serves the city of Jagdalpur. Its code is JDB.  The station consists of three platforms and is well sheltered. It lacks water and sanitation facilities.

During the year of 2015, only twenty-seven platform tickets were sold at the Jagdalpur station, the worst in Indian Railways history.

References

Railway junction stations in India
Railway stations in Bastar district
Railway stations in Waltair railway division